Granville is a station on the Chicago Transit Authority's Red Line, part of the Chicago 'L' rapid transit system.  It is located at 1119 West Granville Avenue in Chicago, Illinois. It is in the Edgewater neighborhood, close to the Rogers Park border. From Granville, trains take 36 minutes to reach the Chicago Loop. Purple Line weekday rush hour express service use the outside tracks and do not stop at this station.

History
Granville station was opened as North Edgewater in 1908. The station was rebuilt in 1921, and the name was changed to Granville. The current station dates to 1980 when an escalator and elevator were added, making this the first Chicago ‘L’ station to feature an elevator for accessibility.

A police station, jointly administered by Loyola University Chicago, the Chicago Transit Authority, and the Chicago Police Department was opened outside the Granville station on March 13, 2006.

2012 renovation
As part of an $86 million rehabilitation project on the Red Line, the Granville station closed on June 1, 2012, for renovation.  The project lasted approximately one month.  Other north side stations were renovated following Granville's completion. The Granville station reopened at 10 p.m. on July 13, 2012.

Bus connections
CTA
 36 Broadway

References

External links 

 Granville Station Page at Chicago-'L'.org
Broken links:
 Train schedule (PDF) at CTA official site
Granville Station Page CTA official site
Granville Avenue entrance from Google Maps Street View

CTA Red Line stations
Railway stations in the United States opened in 1908
1908 establishments in Illinois